The moustached treeswift (Hemiprocne mystacea) is a species of bird in the family Hemiprocnidae.
It is found in the northern Moluccas, New Guinea, Bismarck and the Solomon Islands archipelagos.
Its natural habitats are subtropical or tropical moist lowland forests, subtropical or tropical mangrove forests, and subtropical or tropical moist montane forests.

References

moustached treeswift
Birds of the Maluku Islands
Birds of New Guinea
Birds of the Bismarck Archipelago
Birds of the Solomon Islands
moustached treeswift
Taxonomy articles created by Polbot